Pushkinsky District is a district of the federal city of St. Petersburg, Russia. As of the 2010 Census, its population was 135,973; up from 101,655 recorded in the 2002 Census.

Municipal divisions
Pushkinsky District comprises the municipal towns of Pavlovsk and Pushkin and the municipal settlements of Alexandrovskaya, Shushary, and Tyarlevo.

References

Notes

Sources

 
